KRT38 is a keratin gene.